Wilfred Debissette (born 16 July 1961) is a Trinidadian cricketer. He played in five first-class and three List A matches for Trinidad and Tobago from 1982 to 1985.

See also
 List of Trinidadian representative cricketers

References

External links
 

1961 births
Living people
Trinidad and Tobago cricketers